Inkpen Common is a hamlet and former common in the English county of Berkshire, within the civil parish of Inkpen.

It is the location of the Crown and Garter public house. Part of the old common remains as a Site of Special Scientific Interest, called Inkpen Common SSSI, between the hamlet and Hell Corner. It is managed by the Berkshire, Buckinghamshire and Oxfordshire Wildlife Trust.

Parks and open spaces in Berkshire
Hamlets in Berkshire
West Berkshire District